Dichorda consequaria is a species of emerald moth in the family Geometridae. It is found in Central America and North America.

The MONA or Hodges number for Dichorda consequaria is 7054.

Subspecies
These two subspecies belong to the species Dichorda consequaria:
 Dichorda consequaria consequaria
 Dichorda consequaria perpendiculata Warren, 1904

References

Further reading

External links

 

Geometrinae
Articles created by Qbugbot
Moths described in 1884